Jhajha Public School  is a co-educational, English medium, pre nursery to senior secondary school. in Jhajha, Jamui District, Bihar State. India. he school follows the curriculum of the Central Board of Secondary Education and registered with the Bihar Government.

The school's director is Surendra Kumar Nirala, who is also president of Nirala Children “Little Step”.

Schools in Bihar
Jamui district
Educational institutions in India with year of establishment missing